In astrophysics, particularly the study of accretion disks, the epicyclic frequency is the frequency at which a radially displaced fluid parcel will oscillate. It can be referred to as a "Rayleigh discriminant".  When considering an astrophysical disc with differential rotation , the epicyclic frequency  is given by
 , where R is the radial co-ordinate.

This quantity can be used to examine the 'boundaries' of an accretion disc - when  becomes negative then small perturbations to the (assumed circular) orbit of a fluid parcel will become unstable, and the disc will develop an 'edge' at that point.

For a Keplerian disk, .

References 

Fluid dynamics
Astrophysics
Equations of astronomy